Juan José Saravia, AMC, (born October 8, 1969) is a Mexican cinematographer known for being one of the pioneers in the research, use, training, and development of digital cinematographic technology in Mexico, as well as in research and experimentation in cinematography, animation, and interactive media. He has taught courses and workshops at various universities and film schools throughout the Mexican territory.

Born in Mexico City, he studied the technical career of photography at the Active School of Photography in Mexico City and has a degree in communication with a specialization in cinematography from the Ibero-American University.

In 2004, Saravia became member of the Mexican Society of Cinematographers (AMC), and, by 2009, founded and edited the magazine 23.98 fotogramas por segundo, a publication of the AMC that is still being published as of 2020. From 2007 to 2013, he served as vice president in function of a presidency with cinematographers Carlos R. Diazmuñoz Cerdán and Oscar Hijuelos. He then became president of the society until 2016.
Saravia has been nominated for two Silver Goddess Awards, winning one of them in 2005 for the film Matando Cabos (2004).

He is currently attached to La venganza del Mascarita, the sequel to Matando Cabos, directed by Alejandro Lozano.

Filmography
Film

Short films

Television

References

External links
Juan José Saravia - IMDb
Juan José Saravia - AMACC
MATANDO CABOS CON JUAN JOSÉ SARAVIA

1969 births
Mexican cinematographers
Living people